Emmanuel AME Church, also known as Deliverance Temple Holy Church, is a historic African Methodist Episcopal church building located at 710 Kent Street in Durham, Durham County, North Carolina. The Gothic Revival building was constructed in 1888.  The 30 inch walls were covered with stucco in 1962.  Both the bricks and land for the church were donated by Richard B. Fitzgerald, a prominent African American brickmaker.

It was added to the National Register of Historic Places in 1985.

References

Churches in Durham, North Carolina
African Methodist Episcopal churches in North Carolina
African-American history in Durham, North Carolina
Churches on the National Register of Historic Places in North Carolina
Gothic Revival church buildings in North Carolina
Churches completed in 1888
19th-century Methodist church buildings in the United States
National Register of Historic Places in Durham County, North Carolina